"The First Time Ever I Saw Your Face" is a 1957 love song written by the British folk musician and songwriter Ewan MacColl.

The First Time Ever I Saw Your Face may also refer to:

 The First Time Ever (I Saw Your Face) (Vikki Carr album), 1972
 The First Time Ever (I Saw Your Face) (Johnny Mathis album), 1972

See also
Since First I Saw Your Face is the title of a love-song set to music in 1607 by Thomas Ford (composer) and again in 1942 in the Arnold Book of Old Songs by Roger Quilter.